KNOU may refer to:

 Korea National Open University
 KWMZ-FM, an Empire, Louisiana radio station that held the KNOU call sign from 2001 to 2012
 WFUN-FM, a Saint Louis, Missouri radio station that held the KNOU call sign from 2015 to 2020
 KNX-FM, a Los Angeles, California radio station that held the KNOU call sign in 2021